Transcription factor 19 is a protein that in humans is encoded by the TCF19 gene.

References

Further reading